Dougal Russell Jr. (June 11, 1911 – October 10, 1995) was a professional American football player. In the 1935 season, Russell led the NFL in rushing yards with 499. On November 27, 1938, during a game against the Cleveland Rams, Russell threw a 98-yard touchdown pass to Gaynell Tinsley.

References

External links

NFL.com player page
Career statistics
Football And America: WW II Honor Roll

1911 births
1995 deaths
People from Washington County, Pennsylvania
Players of American football from Pennsylvania
American football fullbacks
American football halfbacks
American football quarterbacks
Kansas State Wildcats football players
Chicago Cardinals players
Cleveland Rams players
United States Navy personnel of World War II
United States Navy officers
Military personnel from Pennsylvania